Academic Graffiti is a book of clerihews by W. H. Auden and illustrations by Filippo Sanjust. It was published in 1971.

Auden began writing in 1950 the short comic poems on literary and historical figures that he would later collect in Academic Graffiti. A selection of these clerihews appeared in his 1960 book Homage to Clio, and the complete collection appeared in this 1971 volume.

References
John Fuller, W. H. Auden: A Commentary (1999)
Edward Mendelson, Later Auden (1999)

External links
 The W. H. Auden Society

1971 poetry books
Books by W. H. Auden
Poetry by W. H. Auden
Faber and Faber books